Markt Nordheim is a municipality in the district of Neustadt (Aisch)-Bad Windsheim in Franconia in Germany.

Mayor
Harald Endreß was elected the new mayor in March 2014. He is the successor of Hans Strauß.

References

Neustadt (Aisch)-Bad Windsheim